The Bossier-Shreveport Mudbugs were a professional ice hockey team which played in the Bossier City-Shreveport metropolitan area of Louisiana.  From 1997 to 2001, the Bossier-Shreveport Mudbugs were members of the Western Professional Hockey League, until a 2001 merger between the WPHL with the Central Hockey League. From 2001 to 2011, the Bossier-Shreveport Mudbugs played in the Central Hockey League. From 1997 until 2000, they were known as the Shreveport Mudbugs, changing the name to the Bossier-Shreveport Mudbugs after the team relocated from the Hirsch Coliseum in Shreveport to the CenturyTel Center in Bossier City.

One of the few successful sports teams from the Bossier-Shreveport area, the Mudbugs found success early. Coached by former Mudbug player Scott Muscutt and owned by Tommy and Leslie Scott, the team increased attendance each year and hosted the All-Star festivities for the Central Hockey League in 2007. The Mudbugs maintained heated rivalries with the Texas Brahmas, Laredo Bucks, Mississippi RiverKings, and Colorado Eagles.

History
In their first four seasons, the Mudbugs saw their most success. After the sweep from the Fort Worth Brahmas in the second round of their opening season, the Mudbugs went on to win the President's Cup Championships three straight years in the WPHL. Following the merger of the WPHL and CHL, the Mudbugs found their way back to the Ray Miron President's Cup Finals three times (2004, 2006, 2011). The Mudbugs were the only team in history of the WPHL and CHL to ever win the Cup three straight years.

During the 2009–10 season, Mudbugs legend goaltender Ken Carroll and Travis Clayton were named to the Central Hockey League's All Decade Team.

On July 20, 2010 former player Jason Campbell was named the new Vice President & General Manager for the Mudbugs.

With the merger of the CHL and the IHL beginning with the 2010–11 season, the Mudbugs played in the Berry Conference. The Mudbugs would go on to win the Ray Miron President's Cup that season in a seven-game series with the Colorado Eagles, but would cease operations two weeks later citing low attendance and financial issues.

In October 2015, it was announced that a new Mudbugs team would return for the 2016–17 season after signing a 12-year lease agreement with the Louisiana State Fairgrounds to play their home games in the Hirsch Coliseum as a member of the Tier II junior North American Hockey League. On April 8, 2016, the Shreveport Mudbugs were officially announced as an expansion team in the NAHL.

Season-by-season results

WPHL & CHL team awards and trophies
Ray Miron President's Cup Champions
1998–1999
1999–2000
2000–2001
2010-2011

Governor's Cup Champions
1998–1999
2006–2007
2007–2008

Central Hockey League Northern Conference Champions
2003–2004
2005–2006

Division Championships
WPHL Eastern Division 1998–1999
WPHL Eastern Division 1999–2000
CHL Northeastern Division 2003–2004
CHL Northeastern Division 2004–2005
CHL Northeastern Division 2005–2006
CHL Northeastern Division 2006–2007
CHL Northeastern Division 2007–2008

Central Hockey League Franchise of the Year
2005–2006

WPHL & CHL player awards and trophies
Central Hockey League Coach of the Year
Scott Muscutt: 2007-08

Central Hockey League Rookie of the Year
Cam Abbott: 2006-07

Central Hockey League Most Outstanding Goaltender
Ken Carroll: 2005-06
John DeCaro: 2006-07, 2007–08

Western Professional Hockey League Rookie of the Year
Ken Carroll: 2000-01

Western Professional Hockey League Playoff Most Valuable Player
John Vecchiarelli: 1998-99
Hugo Hamelin: 1999-00
Jason Campbell: 2000-01

Western Professional Hockey League Man of the Year
Scott Muscutt: 1999-00

Western Professional Hockey League Most Outstanding Goaltender
Kevin St.Pierre: 1997-98
Ken Carroll: 2000-01

Franchise individual records
Most Saves in a single game: Ken Carroll, 57 (March 19, 2007)
Most Goals in a season: Paul Jackson, 55 (1997–98)
Most Assists in a season: Brian Shantz, 82 (1997–98)
Most Points in a season: Paul Jackson, 115 (1997–98)
Most Penalty Minutes in a season: Dan Wildfong, 340 (2001–02)
Most Wins in a season: Kevin St. Pierre, 36 (1997–98)
Most Shutouts in a season: John DeCaro, 10 (2007–08)
Most Goals in a career: Dan Wildfong, 213 (1999–2007)
Most Assists in a career: Dan Wildfong, 339 (1999–2007)
Most Points in a career: Dan Wildfong, 552 (1999–2007)
Most Penalty Minutes in a career: Dan Wildfong, 2234 (1999–2007)
Most Win in a career: Ken Carroll, 187 (2000-01 & 2002–2010)
Most Shutouts in a career: Ken Carroll, 31 (2000-01 & 2002–2010)

Franchise records
Most Goals in a season: 315 (1998–99)
Fewest Goals Against in a season: 146 (2003–04)
Most Points in a season: 99 (1998–99)
Most Penalty Minutes in a season: 1,988 (1997–98)
Most Wins in a season: 47 (1998–99)
Fewest Losses in a season: 14 (2006–07)
Consecutive victories: 15 (12/08/2007-1/20/2008)
Consecutive victories on home ice: 17 (12/08/2007-Current)
All Time Regular Season Wins: 439
All Time Regular Season Losses: 195
All Time Regular Seasons Overtime Losses: 68
All Time Wins: 506
All Time Losses: 229
Games Played: 803

References

External links
Bossier-Shreveport Mudbugs
Mudbugs Swamp

 
1997 establishments in Louisiana
2011 disestablishments in Louisiana
Defunct Central Hockey League teams
Ice hockey clubs established in 1997
Ice hockey teams in Louisiana
Ice hockey clubs disestablished in 2011